Coimbatore or Kovai is a major city in the Indian state of Tamil Nadu. It is the second largest city and urban agglomeration in the state after Chennai and the sixteenth largest urban agglomeration in India. It is administered by the Coimbatore Municipal Corporation and is the administrative capital of Coimbatore district. It is one of the fastest growing tier-II cities in India and a major textile, industrial, commercial, educational, information technology, healthcare and manufacturing hub of Tamil Nadu. It is often referred to as the "Manchester of South India" due to its cotton production and textile industries.

Train service in Coimbatore started in 1861, upon construction of the Podanur–Madras line connecting Kerala and the west coast with the rest of India. Coimbatore lies on the Coimbatore–Shoranur  broad gauge railway line. Until 1956, the Coimbatore railway division was functioning with Podanur as its Headquarters. In 1956, the headquarters was shifted to Olavakkode, of Kerala , and was named Olavakkod railway division. In 1980, Olavakkod division was renamed Palakkad railway division. It comprised Kerala and western districts of Tamil Nadu. Ultimately, a new Salem railway division was carved out of the Palakkad railway division in 2006 with Salem as its headquarters. The city falls under the Salem Division of the Southern Railway zone of Indian Railways. Other major railway stations catering to the city include ,  and minor stations at Peelamedu, Singanallur, Perianaikanpalayam, Somanur, Sulur & Thudiyalur .

List of railway stations

Metrorail

Three metrorail routes have been proposed. Two circular routes, in the northern and southern parts of the city and a dual linear line connecting the Eastern and Western parts. The Northern Route starts from Gandhipuram via Ganapathy, Sivanandha colony, Saibaba colony, RS Puram, Townhall,  and ends in Gandhipuram. The second circular route starts from  via Trichy Road, Sungam, Redfields, Race Course, City railway station, Ukkadam and ends at Podanur. A linear line was also proposed from Chinniampalayam, Coimbatore International Airport, CODISSIA, PSG Tech, Lakshmi Mills, Gandhipuram, Cowley Brown Road and TNAU. Recently Vadavalli and Thondamuthur are the two new areas that has been included in the linear line as part of the phase extension. In 2017,Tamil Nadu government announced that CMRL would prepare DPR and feasibility report for Coimbatore metro rail project and will be funded by German-based company.

Coimbatore suburban circular railway
Coimbatore suburban circular railway is a circular suburban railway planned for Coimbatore city. The circular railway line will help run through Coimbatore Junction, Podanur, Vellalore, Irugur, Singanallur, Peelamedu and Coimbatore North (see map). This will certainly help decongest the city roads. A senior official with the Salem division says if the revival of an old line can bring about so many benefits, it can be considered.

References

External links

 
Coimbatore